Weeksella massiliensis is a bacterium from the genus of Weeksella. Weeksella massiliensis has been isolated from the urine from a man with acute cystitis Weeksella massiliensis is a human pathogen.

References

Flavobacteria
Bacteria described in 2017